The 1954 Nevada Wolf Pack football team represented the University of Nevada during the 1954 college football season. Nevada competed and returned as a sixteenth–year member of the Far Western Conference (FWC). The Wolf Pack were led by third-year head coach Jake Lawlor, who resigned after the end of the season. They played their home games at Mackay Stadium.

Schedule

References

Nevada
Nevada Wolf Pack football seasons
Nevada Wolf Pack football